ROTK may refer to:

 "Record of the Three Kingdoms", a historical work about the Three Kingdoms era of China
 Romance of the Three Kingdoms, a classic novel written by Luo Guanzhong set in the Three Kingdoms era of China
 Romance of the Three Kingdoms (computer game) a video game franchise from KOEI
 Romance of the Three Kingdoms (TV series), a Chinese TV series
 Romance of the Three Kingdoms (HK comic), a Hong Kong Chinese comic series
 Romance of the Three Kingdoms (anime), an anime series
 The Return of the King (volume) of the Lord of the Rings epic high fantasy novel series by J.R.R. Tolkien
 The Return of the King (1980 film), animated film
 The Lord of the Rings: The Return of the King third and final installment of Peter Jackson's Lord of the Rings trilogy
 The Lord of the Rings: The Return of the King (video game)

See also
 Romance of the Three Kingdoms (disambiguation)